Wah Cantonment (often abbreviated to Wah Cantt) is a military cantonment located in Wah in the Punjab province of Pakistan. It is a part of Taxila Tehsil of Rawalpindi District. It is the 24th largest city of Pakistan by population.

History 
Wah Cantt is adjacent to ancient city of Taxila, a small town enriched with one of the most important archaeological sites of the world and the "First University of The World".

The name 'Wah' has its roots in the Mughal era with the Mughal emperor Jehangir reported to have coined the name when he was camped at Wah village, originally called 'Jalal Sar', en route to Lahore after a visit to Kashmir. Emperor Jehangir's army was tired and they were looking for a place to rest where there was a natural source of water. As soon as the emperor saw a place with a natural spring, he loudly said, "Wah" ("Wow"). Later people started calling the area 'Wah'.

The Mughal adventure in this area had a strong influence on the architecture of the village and surrounding area which is still visible to date, especially in the Wah Gardens. Some of the most popular places in Wah Cantt are Wah Ordnance Club and POF hotel besides the nearby Pakistan Ordnance Factory complex with 20 factories or industrial units producing artillery, tanks, and anti-aircraft ammunition for the Pakistan Armed Forces.

Military 
Wah Cantt is a military cantonment. It is completely locked down for traffic except through the barriers controlled by Pakistan Military Guards. All the entering cars have to have a pass or permit otherwise they can not enter the city.  A temporary pass can be picked up at the entrance to the city by surrendering your ID card which you can pick up when you are leaving the city.

The city is governed by Cantonment Board Wah (CBWAH).
A

Education 
Wah has a literacy rate of effectively 100%. This small city has two chartered universities, one medical college, one engineering college and many other technical schools and colleges. Students from Wah Cantt can be found studying at many of the top institutes of Pakistan and abroad. Historically, many surrounding places show links of the area to its past as the neighboring ancient town of Taxila had been a seat of learning for thousands of years.

Apart from numerous private and government schools and colleges, foundations of professional universities have been laid down in the past five years, including the Wah Medical College, Wah Engineering College, the University of Wah,the COMSATS University Islamabad (Wah Campus) and also one of the top engineering colleges the Swedish College of Engineering and Technology Wah Cantt (Aff. With UET Taxila).

References

External links

Union councils of Taxila Tehsil
Populated places in Taxila Tehsil
Cantonments of Pakistan